The 1967 Pan American Games were held in Winnipeg, Manitoba, Canada, from July 23 to August 6, 1967.

Winnipeg was chosen as host of the Pan American Games on its second try.  It first bid for the 1963 Games at the 1959 PASO meeting in Chicago.  It lost to São Paulo, Brazil. The Winnipeg Pan American Society then turned its sights to 1967 and was named host nation at the PASO meeting at the São Paulo Games.

Host city selection 

Three cities submitted bids to host the '1967 Pan American Games that were recognized by the Pan American Sports Organization (PASO). On April 22, 1963, Winnipeg was selected over Caracas and Santiago to host the V Pan American Games by the PASO at its general assembly in Sao Paulo, Brazil.

Medal count 

To sort this table by nation, total medal count, or any other column, click on the  icon next to the column title.

Note
 The medal counts for the United States, Canada and Argentina are disputed.

Sports

Venues

The games used 17 different venues with a few still in use after 1967:

 Winnipeg Stadium – opened in 1953 it was used for the opening ceremonies; it was demolished in 2013 for re-development as retail and commercial site known as The Plaza at Polo Park
 Pan Am Stadium, University of Manitoba – hosted track and field and since renamed University Stadium
 Pan Am Pool – Swimming and diving; re-used for 1999 Pan Am Games and now in use as public pool
 Winnipeg Revolver and Pistol Association – shooting (rifle/pistol) ranges belong to a private shooting club. Team storage building now in use as an indoor pistol range.
 Winnipeg Velodrome – Cycling; demolished 1998 and now site of retail stores
 Royal Alexandra Hotel - Press Centre; built in 1908 it closed shortly after the Games ended and demolished in 1971

Broadcast

 CBC Television

References

External links
 Winnipeg 1967 - V Pan American Games - Official Report at PanamSports.org

 
Pan-Am Games
P
Sports competitions in Winnipeg
Multi-sport events in Canada
Pan American Games
Pan American Games
Pan American Games
Pan American Games
20th century in Winnipeg